Chai Jin is a fictional character in Water Margin, one of the four great classical novels in Chinese literature. Nicknamed "Little Whirlwind", he ranks 10th among the 36 Heavenly Spirits, the first third of the 108 Stars of Destiny.

Background and history
The novel depicts Chai Jin as handsome-looking with eyebrows like those of a dragon, eyes like those of a fenghuang, red lips and white teeth. He is descended from Chai Rong, the second emperor of the short-lived Later Zhou dynasty. The Later Zhou general Zhao Kuangyin usurped the imperial throne from Chai Rong's young son, Chai Zongxun, in the Coup at Chen Bridge of 960 AD and became the founding emperor of the Song dynasty. According to Water Margin, Zhao Kuangyin felt guilty about the usurpation so he treated the Chai clan well, granting them many privileges which were later passed on to their descendants. Among these was immunity from prosecution except for capital crimes. The privilege was inscribed in a danshu tiequan (丹書鐵券; literally, "iron certificate inked in red"). Chai Jin inherits his ancestors' residence in Cangzhou, Hebei, and the danshu tiequan.

Lin Chong, Wu Song and Song Jiang have all sought shelter in Chai Jin's residence when they were on the run from the law. That is because Chai could guarantee them safety with his danshu tiequan, which also bars the authorities from searching his house. Fairly good in martial arts, Chai is known to open his door to all chivalrous men and will provide them generously with money when they leave. Many Liangshan outlaws regard him as their protector embedded in high society.

Imprisonment
Yin Tianxi is the brother-in-law of Gao Lian, the prefect of Gaotangzhou (高唐州; around present-day Gaotang County, Shandong) and cousin of Grand Marshal Gao Qiu, who serves in the imperial court in Dongjing. Covetous of the mansion of Chai Jin's uncle, Yin has been harassing the family to force them to surrender it for free. As the old man would not budge, the latter orders his thugs to beat him up. Chai Jin hurries from Cangzhou to Gaotangzhou when told of his uncle's condition, but the latter soon dies from his injuries. Yin comes again to seize the house. He orders his men to beat Chai Jin, who obstructs his way at the gate. Liangshan's Li Kui is with Chai at that time as he has been ordered to stay away from the stronghold, at least temporarily, as an appeasement to Zhu Tong. Zhu is furious with Li for killing a magistrate's four-year-old son placed in his care. The killing is ordered by Wu Yong, Liangshan's chief strategist, to leave Zhu with no choice but to join Liangshan. Seeing Chai Jin is bullied, Li Kui charges forth and thrashes Yin to death. Chai tells Li to flee. When told of Yin's death, Gao Lian is furious and orders Chai be arrested, dismissing the latter's danshu tiequan as a piece of empty and obsolete document.

Song Jiang launches a military attack on Gaotangzhou to save Chai Jin. After Gongsun Sheng defeats Gao Lian in a battle of magic, the outlaws flock into the prison to search for Chai Jin. But none could locate him. A jailer tells them he has hidden Chai in a dry well to keep him from being harmed by Gao. Li Kui volunteers to go down the deep shaft to fetch Chai up. As Chai has been tormented and deprived of nourishment for days, he is close to death when hauled out of the well. Fortunately, he survives. Chai Jin joins Liangshan, knowing that the danshu tiequan is a fraud.

Becoming an outlaw
Chai Jin is placed in charge of Liangshan's accounts with Li Ying after the 108 Stars of Destiny came together in what is called the "Grand Assembly". He participates in the campaigns against the Liao invaders and rebel forces in Song territory following amnesty from Emperor Huizong for Liangshan. 

Midway in the campaign against Fang La, Chai Jin and Yan Qing travel to Fang's base in Qingxi County (清溪縣; present-day Chun'an County, Zhejiang) in the guise of merchants in a plan to infiltrate his rebel force. Chai Jin, using the false name "Ke Yin",  is brought before Fang, who is charmed by his looks and eloquence. He even marries his daughter to him. When Fang fights his last-ditch battle with Liangshan, Chai Jin suddenly sets upon his force. Fang La‘s side is thrown into disarray, leading to his capture. Chai's wife hangs herself.

Later life
Chai Jin is one of the Liangshan heroes who survive all the campaigns. After serving in the imperial court for a while, he resigns, certain that sooner or later he would be punished for having been Fang La's son-in-law. He returns to Cangzhou and lives in comfort for the rest of his life.

See also
 List of Water Margin minor characters#Chai Jin's story for a list of supporting minor characters from Chai Jin's story.

References
 
 
 
 
 
 
 

36 Heavenly Spirits
Fictional socialites
Fictional characters from Hebei